Isla del Rey is the largest island in the Pearl Islands in the Gulf of Panama. Its current name is probably more a reference to Christ the King than to a secular king. There are four towns, which are San Miguel (pop. 967), La Esmeralda (pop. 524), La Ensenada (pop. 94) and La Guinea (pop. 83). It is larger than the other Pearl Islands combined, and is the second largest island in Panama, after Coiba.

The first European to see Isla del Rey was Vasco Núñez de Balboa in October 1513 on his first expedition to the Pacific Ocean. He could only see the islands from afar, as the poor weather prevented his canoes from landing there. He named the island Isla Rica (Rich Island).

External links 

 Image of Isla del Rey

Rey
Gulf of Panama
Panamá Province